The Château du Bois de Sanzay is located in Saint-Martin-de-Sanzay, between Thouars and Saumur.

History

According to documents of the Saint Laon de Thouars abbey, in 1487 the land was bought from the clergy by "François de Beaumont, chevalier Seigneur du Boys de Sanzay". The central building was built in the 15th century, and additions were made in the 18th century.

Architecture 

Built using large blocks of tufa stone for some parts and rubble for other parts, the main building has high chimneys, three monumental gothic fireplaces, an échauguette, a chapel, and cellars. The domain also comprises a  dovecote, a French formal garden, and a pond.

See also
 List of castles in France

References

External links
 Section describing the castle on the Saint-Martin de Sanzay city website

Châteaux in Deux-Sèvres